Coulson is a ghost town located in Yellowstone County, Montana, United States, on the north bank of the Yellowstone River, approximately one mile east of present-day downtown Billings.

References

Billings, Montana
Ghost towns in Montana
Billings metropolitan area
Boot Hill cemeteries
American frontier